Hinduism is a minority religion in Ireland, followed by 0.4% of the country's population. It is also the second fastest-growing religions by percentage in Ireland. Despite this, there are only a small number of recognised temples in the country.

Demographics

The 2016 Irish Census recorded 14,300 Hindu residents in Ireland, making up 0.30% of the population. According to Pew Research, there were 20,000 (0.4%) Hindus in Ireland in 2020.

In the 2016 Irish Census, Hinduism grew by 34% to surpass 14000 people, even faster than Islam (29% increase over the same time period). Hinduism now makes up 0.3% of the population, growing 10-fold as a share of the population in 25 years (from the 1991 census to the 2016 census). Hinduism is now the 7th largest Religion, ahead of Pentecostal.

According to the 2016 census, there are 87 Hare Krishnas in Ireland, down from 91 Hare Krishna's in 2011 census.

Age and sex
Hindus are younger than the general population with an average age for men of 29.5 and for women 27.3 compared with 36.7 and 38.0 for the general population. There were 132 Hindu men for every 100 Hindu women in 2016, a ratio which has fallen from 157 per 100 ten years earlier.

Profession and Social class
Just over half (50.6%) of Hindus at work were in the broad occupational category 'professional'. Of all Hindus workers 15.0 per cent were programmers and software development professionals. Hindus (18.4%) were more concentrated in the higher social classes than the general population(8.1%) while 40.5 per cent lived in households classified to the managerial or technical class. Fewer relative numbers were found in the skilled manual, semi-skilled and unskilled occupations than for the general population (16.1% and 28.2% respectively).

Nationality and ethnicity

In all 41.7 per cent of Hindus were of Indian nationality. This was followed very closely by Irish (41.6%), Mauritian (6.9%) and Nepalese (3.0%). Of the Hindus with Irish nationality (5,676 persons), 35.1 per cent were born in Ireland.

The census results show that 79.5 per cent of Hindus declared themselves to be of Asian (other than Chinese) ethnicity, compared with 80.4 per cent in 2011.

Hindu temples
The following is a list of known Hindu temples in the Republic of Ireland.

Donegal
Temples in Donegal:
Hindu Temple and Indian Community Centre, Letterkenny, Co. Donegal

Dublin
Temples in Dublin:
Nivedita House (Ramakrishna Math and Mission), Dublin
Hare Krishna Cultural Centre (ISKCON), Dublin 1.
Vinayaka Temple, Kingswood, Dublin 24.
Vedic Hindu Cultural Centre Ireland Temple , Unit 2D, Sunbury Industrial Estate, Ballymount Rd Lower, Walkinstown, Dublin 12.

Meath
Temples in Meath:
B.A.P.S. Swaminarayan Sanstha, Enfield, County Meath.

See also

Religion in the Republic of Ireland
Hinduism in Northern Ireland
Hinduism in the United Kingdom
Hinduism in England
Hinduism in Scotland
Hinduism in Wales
Hinduism in the West
Hindu eschatology

References

Ireland
Republic
Ireland
Hinduism in the Republic of Ireland